Stalachtis calliope is a species of butterfly of the family Riodinidae. It is found in the South America.

Subspecies
Stalachtis calliope calliope (Surinam, French Guiana, Brazil: Amazonas)
Stalachtis calliope bicoler Staudinger, [1887] (Peru)
Stalachtis calliope voltumna Stichel, 1911 (Ecuador)

References

Riodininae
Riodinidae of South America
Fauna of the Amazon
Lepidoptera of Brazil
Lepidoptera of Ecuador
Lepidoptera of French Guiana
Fauna of Peru
Fauna of Suriname
Environment of Amazonas (Brazilian state)
Butterflies described in 1758
Taxa named by Carl Linnaeus